Julia Mejia is an At-Large City Councilor in Boston, Massachusetts. Elected in 2019, Mejia is the first Latina elected to the council.

Biography 
Born in the Dominican Republic and raised by a single mother, Mejia came to the United States when she was five years old. She graduated from Dorchester High School and earned a Bachelor of Arts from Mount Ida College.

Mejia worked as a reporter for MTV covering the 2000 U.S. presidential election and an organizer with Massachusetts Charter Public School Association. She is the founder of Collaborative Parent Leadership Action Network (CPLAN).

Mejia ran for one of four at-large Boston City Council seats in November 2019 in a field of eight candidates. After a recount, she won the fourth seat by one vote. Mejia took office on January 6, 2020, becoming the first immigrant to serve on the council.

Mejia lives with her daughter, Annalise, in the Dorchester neighborhood of Boston.

Electoral history

References 

Boston City Council members
American politicians of Dominican Republic descent
Dominican Republic emigrants to the United States
Hispanic and Latino American city council members
Hispanic and Latino American women in politics
Mount Ida College alumni
People from Dorchester, Massachusetts
Massachusetts Democrats
Year of birth missing (living people)
Living people
Women city councillors in Massachusetts
21st-century American politicians
21st-century American women politicians